Bread & Circus is the debut album by American alternative rock band Toad the Wet Sprocket, originally self-released on cassette in 1988, and re-released in 1989 by Columbia Records.

In May 2009, the band announced plans to re-release Bread & Circus, out of print since 2001, in a remastered edition with expanded artwork and unreleased tracks culled from the album sessions. In 2010, the band signed a deal with Primary Wave to handle their back catalog and licensing. The reissues had been confirmed by lead singer Glen Phillips via Toad's "Fan Questions" portion of their official website for release in 2011, but never occurred.

Production
The album was recorded over eight days for a total cost of $650. Singer Glen Phillips wrote most of the lyrics when he was only 15 years old. Before agreeing to sign with Columbia, the band insisted that the label re-release the album in unchanged form.

Critical reception
Trouser Press called the band "initially an R.E.M. clone: a little jangle in the guitars, some nice harmonies and not much else." The Chicago Tribune wrote that the band "lacks R.E.M.'s melodic sense, evocative imagery and adrenaline."

Track listing

Personnel 

 Glen Phillips – Vocals, Guitar
 Todd Nichols – Guitar, Producer
 Randy Guss – Drums, Producer
 Dean Dinning – Bass, Vocals (background), Producer
 Brian Gardner – Mastering
 Brad Nack – Artwork, Coach, Cover Art
 Pete Tangen – Photography
 Toad the Wet Sprocket – Producer
 David Vaught – Engineer, Mixing

Charts
Singles - Billboard (North America)

References

Toad the Wet Sprocket albums
1989 debut albums
Columbia Records albums